The Missouri–Oklahoma football rivalry is an American college football rivalry between the Missouri Tigers football team of the University of Missouri and Oklahoma Sooners football team of the University of Oklahoma. The Tiger–Sooner Peace Pipe is the trophy awarded to the winner of the game.

Series history
Missouri and Oklahoma's football teams first played in 1902, and played annually from 1910–95, with only a one-year interruption in 1918 during World War I. The Tiger-Sooner Peace Pipe has been awarded since 1929. The Big 12 Conference was formed in 1995, and was split into two divisions. The two universities being placed in different division (Missouri in the Big 12 North Division, Oklahoma in the South Division) prevented an annual matchup. After the formation of the Big 12, the teams played a home-and-home series with three years in between each series (1998–99, 2002–03, 2006–07, 2010–11).

The Sooners won the last meeting 38–28 on September 24, 2011. With Missouri's withdrawal from the Big 12 and admission to the Southeastern Conference effective July 1, 2012, the future of the rivalry is uncertain.

On July 30, 2021, Oklahoma accepted an invitation to join the Southeastern Conference, effective July 1, 2025, potentially reigniting the rivalry. Later, on February 9, 2023, it was reported that Oklahoma would join a year earlier in 2024. Once they join, they will become Missouri's most played conference rival by a landslide, and Oklahoma's second most behind fellow incoming member Texas.

Tiger–Sooner Peace Pipe
In November 1940, a genuine Indian peace pipe was donated by Dr. John S. Knight of Kansas City to become the traveling trophy of the rivalry. Dr. Knight was a 1923 graduate of the University of Missouri. The peace pipe, in the form of a tomahawk, belonged to Chief White Eagle of the Pawnee tribe. The peace pipe was believed to be over 100 years old at the time it was donated in 1940. An inscription on the peace pipe reads "Mystical Seven Society Ceremonial Tomahawk Pipe, University of Missouri vs. University of Oklahoma, Dr. John S. Knight –; donor of peace pipe." Winners of each game are also inscribed on the pipe. The peace pipe was entrusted to MU's Mystical Seven and OU's Pe-et, who would share the peace pipe in the end zone at halftime to celebrate the two universities. The society of the winning university would return the peace pipe to its university until the next meeting of the two teams.

The Sooners were the first to take possession of the peace pipe following their 7–0 victory over the Tigers in 1940. "Oklahoma" was inscribed 19 times on the pipe from 1940 to 1963. After a tie in 1964, OU gave possession of the pipe to MU as Oklahoma had held the trophy so many more times since the trophy's inception. Records indicate that the tradition continued through 1974, but the peace pipe exchange did not take place in 1975. The current location of the pipe is unknown since it was last held by Oklahoma. OU's senior associate athletic director, Kenny Mossman, has indicated that Oklahoma officials have conducted an extensive search of their archives for historical items, and the peace pipe has not been located.

Notable games

2007 Big 12 Championship Game
The Tigers were the Big 12 North's representative to the 2007 Big 12 Championship Game where they faced Big 12 South representative Oklahoma in a rematch of the regular season game of October 13th at the College GameDay broadcast at Oklahoma Memorial Stadium in Norman, Oklahoma, won by the Sooners 41-31. Missouri came into the game ranked #1 in the AP Poll and BCS standings. However, they were upset (Oklahoma was favored by casinos in Las Vegas) by Oklahoma, making their record 11–2 at the time.

2008 Big 12 Championship Game
The 2008 Big 12 Championship Game featured a rematch between the two schools of the 2007 Big 12 Championship Game. This time, Oklahoma was favored and won handily, 62–21.

October 23, 2010
In their 2010 meeting, Mizzou defeated Oklahoma (then ranked No. 1 in the BCS standings). The game was the site of ESPN's College GameDay, where Missouri set the on-campus attendance record for GameDay.

Game results

See also  
 List of NCAA college football rivalry games

References

College football rivalries in the United States
Missouri Tigers football
Oklahoma Sooners football